Chekhovsky District is an administrative and municipal district (raion), one of the thirty-six in Moscow Oblast, Russia. It is located in the south of the oblast. Its administrative center is the town of Chekhov. Population:  109,668 (2002 Census);  The population of Chekhov accounts for 52.7% of the district's total population.

References

Notes

Sources

Districts of Moscow Oblast